Jennifer Harden is geologist known for her research on soils, particularly tracking changes in soil profiles over time and the role of soil systems in carbon and nitrogen cycling.

Education and career 
Harden earned her B.S. (1976), M.S. (1979), and Ph.D. (1982) from the University of California Berkeley. Following her Ph.D. she joined the United States Geological Survey where she became a scientist emeritus in 2013.

Harden was elected a fellow of the American Association for the Advancement of Science in 2011. In 2015, Harden was elected a fellow of the American Geophysical Union who cited her "for fundamental contributions to quantitative understanding of soils in global change and carbon cycling".

Research 
Harden's Ph.D. research used different properties of the soil to establish a "profile development index" or "soil development index" which can be used to track changes in soil over millions of years. Harden and others use this to track the age of soils and changing climate conditions. Harden's research has also considered carbon lost from soils in forests and cropland, and the capture of carbon in soil during deglaciation of the Laurentide Ice Sheet. The connections between fire in boreal forests and carbon is another focus of Harden's research. She has examined the impact of burning and permafrost in soils and assessed the level of organic carbon transferred to the atmosphere from soils in Alaskan forests and peatland. With Margaret Torn, Harden co-advised Asmeret Asefaw Berhe in her research on soil erosion which showed that erosion allow soils to store more carbon. Harden has also quantified the amount of carbon and nitrogen that would be released under different future climate scenarios from Gelisols, soils impacted by permafrost. Through collaborative research projects, Harden has quantified the amount of soil organic carbon stored in permafrost and the release of this organic carbon under warming climate conditions.

Selected publications

Awards and honors 
 Fellow, American Geophysical Union (2015)
 Fellow, American Association for the Advancement of Science (2011)

References

External links 
 

Fellows of the American Association for the Advancement of Science
Fellows of the American Geophysical Union
University of California, Berkeley alumni
United States Geological Survey personnel
Living people
Women geologists
American climatologists
Year of birth missing (living people)